The Château de Tonquédec is a castle in the commune of Tonquédec in the Côtes d'Armor département of France. It is one of the most visited monuments in the Côtes d'Armor.

The present castle was built in the 15th century, on the site of an earlier 12th-century castle.

History
From the height of a rocky cliff, the castle ruins, with its eleven towers and a closed curtain wall, dominates the valley of the Léguer. It is a genuine vestige of feudal Brittany.

The 12th-century castle was the work of the Coëtmen-Penthièvre family. It was partially dismantled by order of Jean IV, Duke of Brittany, in 1395 because of a conflict between him and the Penthièvres. Indeed, Rolland II and Rolland III of Coëtmen, Viscounts of Tonquédec, had allied themselves to the rebellion of Olivier de Clisson.

Reconstruction began in 1406 by Rolland IV of Coëtmen. The castle subsequently changed owners several times, before becoming an artillery base in 1577. At this time, the owning family (Goyon de La Moussaye), being Protestant, was therefore in disagreement with the king, Henri IV. During the War of the League, the castle was a hiding place for Huguenots. It was finally dismantled around 1622 on the orders of the powerful Cardinal Richelieu.

The castle currently belongs to descendants of the original builders (House of Coëtmen-Penthièvre): Count and Countess Bertrand de Rougé.

Since 1862, it has been listed as a monument historique by the French Ministry of Culture.

Visiting the castle

The entrance gate leads to an outer fortified courtyard or basse-cour. Two towers, joined by a curtain wall, frame the entrance to the inner courtyard which is reached by a postern, once protected by a moat and drawbridge. The view from the top gives a good idea of the local countryside: "a wide, fertile and populous plateau is intersected by deep and wooded picturesque valleys".

The ruins may be visited from April to October. They may be hired for location filming, photo shoots and other events.

See also
List of castles in France

References

External links
 
 Le Château de Tonquédec 
 Video about the castle

Ruined castles in Brittany
Châteaux in Côtes-d'Armor
Monuments historiques of Côtes-d'Armor